Isaac Marshall Harrison (8 June 1880 – 25 February 1909) was an English cricketer.  Harrison's batting style is unknown.  He was born at Calverton, Nottinghamshire.

Harrison made his first-class debut for Nottinghamshire against Middlesex at Lord's in the 1901 County Championship.  He made six further first-class appearances in that season for the county, the last of which came against Lancashire at Old Trafford. In his seven first-class appearances for the county, he scored a total of 143 runs at an average of 14.30, with a high score of 33.

He died at the village of his birth on 25 February 1909, following ill-health which had led him to give up playing cricket.

References

External links
Isaac Harrison at ESPNcricinfo
Isaac Harrison at CricketArchive

1880 births
1909 deaths
People from Calverton, Nottinghamshire
Cricketers from Nottinghamshire
English cricketers
Nottinghamshire cricketers